The Sessera is a  long  torrent in the Piedmont region - NW Italy.

Geography 

The Sessera starts in the Biellese Alps on the south-eastern slopes of Monte Bo. 
It initially flows from NW to SE and then encircles the Cima dell'Asnas and forms the artificial lake of Mischie, where it meets its first important tributary, the torrente Dolca (Dolca creek).

With several meanders the Sessera reaches Coggiola and the inhabited part of its valley.
After having received two other relevant tributaries, the Ponzone in Pray from right and the Strona di Postua in Crevacuore from left, it enters into the Valsesia and flows into the river Sesia near Borgosesia.

Floods 
The river caused severe destruction in 1968 along the Sessera Valley.

See also 
 Valle Sessera
 Alpi Biellesi

References

Other projects

Rivers of the Province of Biella
Rivers of the Province of Vercelli
Rivers of the Alps
Rivers of Italy